Jim Ka To (born 28 November 1984 in Hong Kong) is a race car driver who competed in the 2001 Formula Renault 2000 Eurocup and currently competes in the China Touring Car Championship.

The son of Hong Kong street car racer Jim Chong Shing, he started racing at an early age at the Zhuhai International Circuit. He showed great potential in the China Formula Campus series and was sent by Formula Racing Developments to La Filière in France to be trained to become a racing driver.

Upon his return, he took pole position in the Asian Formula 2000 race in Macau at the age of 16. But his single-seater career has stagnated since then. In 2011, he decided to move to touring cars.

2004
In 2004, Jim finished second in the Asian Formula Renault Championship. He then scored a sensational pole position in the Macau Formula Renault race, beating drivers like Kamui Kobayashi, Scott Speed and Bruno Senna. But he crashed in the race and was taken to hospital for a check up. He was uninjured.

He was signed by Red Bull to join their young drivers' programme for 2005 and was to join the Motorpark Oschersleben team that took Scott Speed to the 2004 Formula Renault 2.0 Eurocup title. But due to health problems, he returned to Hong Kong before entering any race in the 2005 series.

2007
In 2007, he competed in the Asian Formula Renault Challenge and won two races in Zhuhai in January and finished best Asian driver that season. He competed with Formula Racing Developments racing team, under the management of Kenneth Ma.

In November 2007, Jim was announced as one of the drivers for Team PTRS for the 2007/08 Asian Formula Three Championship. He partnered Briton Matt Howson.

2008 season

In 2008, Jim competed in the Asian Formula Renault Championship again for Formula Racing Developments, sponsored by Frestech Electrical Appliances. He also competed in the Formula BMW Pacific Series' finale at the Macau Grand Prix.

From 13 to 16 November 2008, Jim took part in the Formula BMW Pacific race in Macau. He qualified 12th  and crashed in the race. His crash caused the race to be stopped and he was classified 7th in the final results.

On 13 and 14 December 2008, Jim competed in the final two rounds of the Asian Formula Renault Championship. He won both races and became the 2008 Asian Formula Renault Champion, beating Geoffrey Kwong.

2008 Assault case
On 4 November 2008, Jim was arrested by the Hong Kong police on suspicion of assault at the Hong Kong–Macau Ferry Terminal. He was charged with assault occasioning actual bodily harm, inflicting grievous bodily harm and assault occasioning actual bodily harm. On 26 May 2009, he was found guilty by the Kwun Tong Magistracy. He remained in custody after conviction and was sentenced to 15 months in prison on 16 June 2009. After three months in jail, he was released on appeal on 16 September 2009.

2009 Formula BMW Pacific

After being released from jail, he entered the 2009 Formula BMW Pacific race at the 2009 Macau Grand Prix. He finished fourth in the race. It was the eighth time he raced in Macau.

2010 Formula BMW Pacific
Jim competed again in the Macau round of the 2010 Formula BMW Pacific season. He qualified 13th  and finished 7th.

2010 accident and conviction
At 2am on 23 June 2010, Jim crashed his friend's car into the back of a taxi on Cherry Street in Hong Kong. He was convicted of careless driving and driving an uninsured car on 10 January 2010 at the Kowloon City Magistrate. He was fined HK$2,900 with his driving license suspended for a year.

2011 and 2012 China Touring Car Championship
In 2011 and 2012, Jim joined 778 Autosport and drove one of their Kias in the China Touring Car Championship.

2013 World Endurance Championship

On 8 March 2013, KCMG announced that Jim will partner Alexandre Imperatori and Matt Howson to drive its no.47 Morgan-Nissan LMP2 entry at the 6 Hours of Silverstone, part of the 2013 FIA World Endurance Championship season. The trio finished the race 6th in class and 12th overall, 5 laps behind the class winner. Chinese driver Ho Pin Tung will take his place in the team for the 2013 24 Hours of Le Mans.

2019 World Touring Car Cup
On 9 October 2019, KCMG announced that Jim Ka To will join KCMG regular WTCR competitors Tiago Monteiro and Attila Tassi for the Suzuka Round of the 2019 World Touring Car Cup in a wild card entry. On 24 October, Jim Ka To is also confirmed to race for KCMG in the FIA WTCR races in Macau.

References

External links 
Driver Profile - 778 Autosport 

1984 births
Living people
Hong Kong racing drivers
Formula Renault Eurocup drivers
Asian Formula Renault Challenge drivers
FIA World Endurance Championship drivers
World Touring Car Cup drivers
24H Series drivers
FIA Motorsport Games drivers
Asian Formula Three Championship drivers
Formula BMW Pacific drivers
KCMG drivers
Team Meritus drivers
Formula BMW Asia drivers